Dunay radar ( literally Danube; NATO: Cat House, Dog House) was a system of two Soviet radars used to detect American ballistic missiles fired at Moscow. They were part of the A-35 anti-ballistic missile system. One sector of one of the radars, the Dunay-3U ("Cat House") is still operational and is run by the Russian Aerospace Defence Forces as part of the Main Control Centre of Outer Space.

Dunay-2
The Dunay-2 was a prototype built in Sary Shagan as part of the experimental missile defence system "A". The NATO codename was "Hen Roost".

Dunay-3M

The Dunay-3 (NATO: Dog House) was an upgrade of the Dunay-2 located in Kubinka, Moscow and became operational in 1968. Following an extensive upgrade in 1978 it was renamed Dunay-3M as part of the upgraded A-35M ABM system.

The receiver was a building × containing 2 passive electronically scanned array radars as well as the command and control centre for the A-35 system.

The radar was functional until it caught fire on 8 May 1988.

Dunay-3UP
This was a prototype of the Dunay-3U and was located in Sary Shagan test site. It was given the NATO codename "Top Roost".

Dunay-3U
The Dunay-3U (NATO: Cat House) was built in 1978 as part of the upgraded A-35M anti-ballistic missile system. There are two sectors. It was capable of identifying the launch of Pershing II missiles from West Germany.

In 1995 A-35M was replaced by the A-135 anti-ballistic missile system which used the Don-2N radar. One sector was decommissioned in 1998 and is now ruined and the other is used for space surveillance of satellites in low Earth orbit. As a UHF radar it can identify smaller objects (15–40 cm) than the VHF radars such as the Daryal and Dnepr.

The Dunay-3U was commissioned in May 1978 with a life of 12 years. Both sectors were extended until 2000 but one sector (62) was decommissioned in 1998. The other one (61) has been extended in 2001 and 2005 – the last extension was until December 2009, but it may have been extended again. In 2012 the Russian Ministry of Defence issued a tender for the demolition of sector 62.

Before 2003 the transmitter had 30 waveguides each excited by a  transmitter. The radar is chirped.

The radar's computer system is made up of 10 K340 computers.

Locations

References

External links

Urban exploration photos from a visit to one sector of the Dunay-3U
Plan of Dunay-3U receiver site (in Russian)
Plan of Dunay-3U transmitter site (in Russian)
Photograph of Dunay-3M receiver from Vympel
Photograph of Dunay-3U receiver from Vympel
Photograph of Dunay-3U transmitter from Vympel

Russian and Soviet military radars
Missile defense
Russian Space Forces
Military equipment introduced in the 1950s